is a Japanese footballer currently playing for  club Yokohama FC.

Career
After being a part of SV Horn for two years, Arai opted to come back to Japan, signing with SC Sagamihara in September 2017.

Club statistics
Updated to 1 January 2020.

References

External links

 Profile at Kataller Toyama
 

1997 births
Living people
Japanese footballers
Association football midfielders
SV Horn players
SC Sagamihara players
Kataller Toyama players
Tokyo Verdy players
Gil Vicente F.C. players
Yokohama FC players
Austrian Regionalliga players
2. Liga (Austria) players
J2 League players
J3 League players
Primeira Liga players
Japanese expatriate footballers
Japanese expatriate sportspeople in Austria
Expatriate footballers in Austria
Japanese expatriate sportspeople in Portugal
Expatriate footballers in Portugal